Rollocks may refer to

 Cyrus Rollocks, a Canadian soccer player
 Daisy Rollocks, better known as Daisy Dee, a singer, actress and TV host
 An alternative spelling of rowlocks, used to hold oars